Highball Signal is a historic railroad signal located in Delmar, Delaware, United States. It is a white sphere mounted on a pole and located next to the railroad tracks to signal permission for a train to proceed at full speed, if the ball was at the top of the pole. The term "highball" came to be synonymous with a clear right-of-way and for trains to proceed at full speed. It was originally in service at New Castle, Delaware, and then at Hurlock, Maryland. The highball signal was moved to Delmar for display during the town's centennial in 1959, and is no longer used to direct railroad traffic, but is maintained as a public exhibition in a park near the railroad.

It was placed on the US National Register of Historic Places in 1973.

References

External links
Delaware Public Archives: Highball Signal

Railway buildings and structures on the National Register of Historic Places in Delaware
Buildings and structures in Sussex County, Delaware